Katy Deacon is a British engineer involved in renewable energy systems. Deacon has been noted for influencing the engineering industry.

Biography
Deacon is an energy engineer working for Kirklees Metropolitan Council.

She has been involved with renewable energy systems in West Yorkshire.

She has worked with renewable energies such as the use of wind turbines and solar power in schools, and systems to automatically monitor consumption of electricity, gas and water across building complexes. During her master's degree, she created a "tool kit" for architects, engineers and other developers about maximizing energy efficiency in buildings, which won the NICEIC award for Energy Efficiency Product of the Year in 2006.

Deacon was presented with the Institution of Engineering and Technology Young Woman Engineer of the Year award in 2007.

She attained chartered engineer status in 2008 and received the Women's Engineering Society (WES) Karen Burt Award in 2009, which is presented to the most outstanding newly-chartered female engineer across the UK engineering and IT institutions.

She has been profiled as "ingenious" by the UKRC and Engineering & Technology magazine.

References

External links
 IET press release 
 Energy and Utility Skills case study 
 Kirklees Metropolitan Council storyboard 
 "Kirklees engineer to focus on women's role in industry", BBC News, 16 February 2011

Year of birth missing (living people)
Living people
British electrical engineers
British women engineers
21st-century women engineers